Tonyn was launched in 1766 at Philadelphia (or North Carolina), as Hyacinth. Between 1772 and 1775 Hyacinth made two voyages as a slave ship in the triangular trade in enslaved people. She was renamed Tonyn in 1779. An American warship captured her in 1781 after a single-ship action.

Hyacinth
Hyacinth was registered at Liverpool in 1772.

1st enslaving voyage (1772–1773): Captain James Salcraig sailed from Liverpool on 10 April 1772, bound for Bassa. Hyacinth arrived in Jamaica in early 1793. She had left Liverpool with 40 crew members and she had 12 when she arrived in Jamaica. She sailed from Jamaica on 25 July and arrived back at Liverpool on 20 September.

2nd enslaving voyage (1774–1775): Captain Salcraig sailed from Liverpool on 3 January 1774. On 25 July she was among the slavers "all well" at Bassa. Hyacinth arrived at St Johns, Antigua, on 4 March 1775 with 285 captives. She sailed on 11 April and arrived back at Liverpool on 26 May.

Hyacinth first appeared in online volumes of Lloyd's Register (LR) in the 1776 issue.

Tonyn
Tonyn first appeared in LR in 1779.

In May 1780, Tonyn, Wade, master, captured a prize worth £1,300.

Governor Tonyn (Tonyn) arrived at St Augustine on 26 October 1780 after a voyage of eight weeks from Liverpool. She sailed for Liverpool on 5 January 1781; she was very leaky and it was expected that she might stop at Charleston if necessary.

Fate
The sloop  captured Tonyn on 9 January 1781. Saratoga took Tonyn into Cap-Français.

The capture, after a fierce battle, took place off the coast of then England's loyal province of East Florida. Tonyn had recently sailed from St. Augustine laden with turpentine, indigo, hides, and deerskins intended for Liverpool England. Captain Young, of Saratoga, spent a day repairing Tonyn and Saratogas rigging, then the two ships got underway on the morning of 11 January for Hispaniola. On 27 January, Saratoga and Tonyn reached Cap-Français, where Captain Young turned Tonyn over to the French Admiralty court.

On 28 March word arrived at St Augustine that Tonyn had been captured. The schooner Hero. Perry, master, sailed on 9 April for Cap-Français under a flag of truce to bring back Captain Wade and his crew. Hero returned on 26 April bringing only Wade and Tonyns doctor; Wade himself had been badly wounded in the engagement with Saratoga. Tonyn had been sold for £2,800; her cargo of turpentine had sold for a poor price.

Citations

References
 
 

1766 ships
Age of Sail merchant ships of England
Liverpool slave ships
Captured ships